Psacadonotus insulanus is a species of insect in family Tettigoniidae. It is endemic to Australia. The insects are known to frequently inhabit Nuytsia farms in Western Australia.

References

Tettigoniidae
Orthoptera of Australia
Endangered fauna of Australia
Taxonomy articles created by Polbot
Insects described in 1993